Philip of Castile (Seville, 28 May 1292 – Madrid, April 1327), was an infante of Castile, son of Sancho IV of Castile and María de Molina.

He was Lord of Cabrera and Ribera and regent of his nephew Alfonso XI of Castile.

He married his cousin Margarita de la Cerda, daughter of Alfonso de la Cerda.

1292 births
1327 deaths
Castilian infantes
Lords of Spain
Castilian House of Burgundy
Regents of Castile
Sons of kings